Major League Baseball (MLB) annually honors its best relief pitchers in the American League (AL) and National League (NL) with the Mariano Rivera AL Reliever of the Year Award and Trevor Hoffman NL Reliever of the Year Award, respectively. The awards are named after former relievers Mariano Rivera and Trevor Hoffman, who played their entire careers in the respective leagues. First issued in 2014, the awards replaced the Delivery Man of the Year Award, which had been presented since 2005.

The Reliever of the Year Awards are based on the votes of a panel of retired relievers. Each voter selects three pitchers for each league based solely on their performance in the regular season; a 5-3-1 weighted point system is used to determine the winner. At its inception in 2014, the panel consisted of the top five relievers in career saves at the time—Rivera, Hoffman, Lee Smith, John Franco, and Billy Wagner—and the four living relief pitchers who were in the Hall of Fame: Dennis Eckersley, Rollie Fingers, Goose Gossage, and Bruce Sutter.

The Reliever of the Year Award winners had all been closers until 2018, when Josh Hader of the Milwaukee Brewers won as a setup man; he later won the NL title in 2019 and 2021 as a closer. In 2019, both winners of the awards were also named in the inaugural All-MLB teams. In 2020, the Brewers' Devin Williams became the first rookie, and the first reliever with no saves, to win the award in either league.

Since 2017, MLB has also issued a Reliever of the Month Award.

Winners

Trevor Hoffman NL Reliever of the Year

Mariano Rivera AL Reliever of the Year

See also

Sporting News Relief Pitcher of the Year Award (2013–present; one in each league)
Sporting News Reliever of the Year Award (1960–2010; one in each league)
Rolaids Relief Man Award (1976–2012; one in each league)
Baseball awards
List of MLB awards

References

External links
 MLB Reliever of the Year Award at Baseball Almanac

Major League Baseball trophies and awards
Awards established in 2014